is a Japanese ice hockey player. She competed in the women's tournament at the 1998 Winter Olympics.

References

1979 births
Living people
Japanese women's ice hockey players
Olympic ice hockey players of Japan
Ice hockey players at the 1998 Winter Olympics
Sportspeople from Hokkaido
Asian Games silver medalists for Japan
Medalists at the 1999 Asian Winter Games
Medalists at the 2003 Asian Winter Games
Ice hockey players at the 1999 Asian Winter Games
Ice hockey players at the 2003 Asian Winter Games
Asian Games medalists in ice hockey